The Palau bush warbler (Horornis annae) is a species of Old World warbler in the family Cettiidae.
It is found only in Palau.

References

Palau bush warbler
Birds of Palau
Endemic birds of Palau
Palau bush warbler
Taxonomy articles created by Polbot